Tapio Laakso (born June 28, 1985) is a Finnish ice hockey centre. He is currently playing with Lukko in the Finnish Liiga.

Laakso made his SM-liiga debut playing with KalPa during the 2007–08 season.

References

External links

1985 births
Living people
Finnish ice hockey centres
KalPa players
HC TPS players
Ilves players